USS Fierce (AM-97) was an  of the United States Navy. Laid down on 18 October 1941 by the Nashville Bridge Co., Nashville, Tennessee; launched on 5 March 1942, and commissioned on 12 October 1942. The ship was reclassified as a submarine chaser, PC-1601 on 1 June 1944, and reclassified as a control submarine chaser PCC-1601 on 20 August 1945.

PC-1601 was decommissioned in December 1945 at San Francisco, California and transferred to the Maritime Commission for disposal on 15 June 1948. Sold to John K. Seaborn and converted into a twin-engined tug and named Seaborn II. Fate unknown. PCC-1601 earned two battle stars for World War II military action.

External links
 

 

Adroit-class minesweepers
Ships built in Tennessee
1942 ships
World War II minesweepers of the United States
World War II patrol vessels of the United States